Lee Yoon-hyung (April 26, 1979 – November 18, 2005) was a South Korean millionaire and daughter of Samsung Group chief Lee Kun-hee. She died by suicide by hanging herself in her New York City apartment on November 18, 2005 at the age of 26.

Personal life
Lee was born on April 26, 1979, in South Korea. Her father was Samsung chief Lee Kun-hee, and her mother was Hong Ra-hee. She was the youngest of the four children; she had an elder brother Lee Jae-yong and two elder sisters Lee Boo-jin and Lee Seo-hyun.

Lee graduated from Ewha Womans University in Seoul with a Bachelor of Arts degree in French language and French literature. She was a first year graduate student in arts management at New York University's Steinhardt School of Culture, Education, and Human Development.

In 2003, it was revealed that she owned $191 million of Samsung stock.

In her spare time, she was very keen on car racing and many extreme sports. She also launched a personal blog to show her daily life to the public and it became very popular in South Korea.

Death
Her cause of death was originally reported in both American and South Korean media as a car crash due to the social stigma against suicide, but the actual details were subsequently published after inquiries by reporters from The Korea Times. 

At the time of her death, Lee was a graduate student at the New York University Steinhardt School of Culture, Education, and Human Development, and her father was in the United States undergoing treatment for lung cancer. A doorman at her building told reporters that she sometimes stayed in her apartment for a week at a time, and there were reports that her father had forbidden her to marry her middle-class Korean boyfriend. 

At the time of her death, Lee had a personal fortune of more than £100 million (US$157 million).

References 

1979 births
2005 suicides
Samsung people
Ewha Womans University alumni
Steinhardt School of Culture, Education, and Human Development alumni
Suicides in New York City
Suicides by hanging in New York City
People from the East Village, Manhattan
2005 deaths
Lee family (South Korea)